Gitanae or Gitana, or Gitona (Γίτωνα), or Titana (Τίτανα or Τιτάνα), was a city of ancient Epirus, described by Livy as being near Corcyra, and about 10 miles from the coast. as a place of meeting of the Epirote League (Concillio Epirotarum). It is not mentioned by any other ancient writer, and it was conjectured that the word is a corrupt form of Chyton, which Ephorus spoke of as a place in Epirus colonised by Ionians from Klazomenai.

However, its site has been located as the place bearing the modern name Gkoumani, near the village of Fragma Kalama in Greece.

Gallery

See also
List of cities in ancient Epirus

References

Populated places in ancient Epirus
Cities in ancient Epirus
Former populated places in Greece
Ancient Greek archaeological sites in Greece